Phoenix Cinema and Arts Centre is a cinema, art gallery and café bar in the city centre of Leicester, England. The two modern cinema screens show everything from micro-budget independent films to the latest Hollywood blockbusters, and there are often festivals and events. The regularly changing art programme presents work by local and international artists, and the education programme provides courses for people of all ages to learn about, and create their own, film and art. During 2014-2015 the venue hosted over 200,000 visitors.

Phoenix is a charity with an overarching aim to 'bring inspiring film and art to all' and was established in 1989. This mission is enacted through its education programme, grants and events to develop upcoming artistic talent and efforts to widen access to cinema, especially through its travelling community cinema. Much of this work is financed through its mainstream cinema ticket sales and its cafe-bar, with sales in these areas increasing by around 10% during 2014-2015.

The venue is currently situated in the Phoenix Square building. Work began on constructing the £21.5 million scheme in November 2007 and was completed in Autumn 2009: Phoenix Square officially opened on 19 November 2009. The cinema replaces the Phoenix Arts Centre, and maintains strong links with De Montfort University. The building houses a digital exhibition space and digital production facilities, two cinema screens, a screen room and screen lounge. Space is provided for 37 new creative businesses, as well as a cafe/bar open to the public.

The venue was formerly known as Phoenix Square, and has been previously referred to as Leicester Digital Media Centre.

References

External links
One Leicester

Cinemas in Leicestershire
Buildings and structures in Leicester
Culture in Leicestershire